Abbeydorney Abbey, also known as Kyrie Eleison Abbey or Odorney was founded by the O Torna, chieftain of the region, in 1154 for the Cistercians from Monasteranenagh.

The abbey was the daughter-house of Nenay Abbey in County Limerick, and was the only medieval Cistercian house in County Kerry.

The name given by the Cistercians, Kyrie Eleison (from Greek: Lord Have Mercy) was in accordance with the order's tradition of giving names which reflected the locality - in this instance the word Kyrie (Lord) being similar to Ciarrai (County Kerry).

The first abbot was Christian O Conarchy who retired to the abbey where he spent his remaining years, being buried there in 1186.

The foundation was dissolved in 1537.

The remains visible today include the 15th century abbey church with west tower and some of the claustral buildings.  The grounds are largely occupied by gravestones and are currently in use as a cemetery.

See also
 List of abbeys and priories in Ireland (County Kerry)
 Abbeydorney

References

External links
 Church Ruins:
 View of Abbey Ruins:
 Modern Church:

Cistercian monasteries in the Republic of Ireland
1154 establishments in Ireland
1537 disestablishments in Ireland
Religious organizations established in the 1150s
Buildings and structures in County Kerry
Religion in County Kerry
Ruins in the Republic of Ireland
Christian monasteries established in the 12th century